Eduardo Amorós (25 April 1943 – 11 January 2023) was a Spanish equestrian. He competed in two events at the 1976 Summer Olympics.

Amorós died in Valencia on 11 January 2023, at the age of 79.

References

External links

1943 births
2023 deaths
Spanish male equestrians
Olympic equestrians of Spain
Equestrians at the 1976 Summer Olympics
Sportspeople from Valencia